Nanou is a 1986 Franco-British feature film directed by Conny Templeman. It stars Imogen Stubbs, Jean-Philippe Écoffey, Michel Robin and Daniel Day-Lewis.

Plot 
In the 1970s, a blonde English student, Nanou, spends just a few months on the continent. She tours Switzerland, but prefers France. In Lorraine, she meets Luc, a handsome worker in the militant extreme left-wing, and trains with him in his activities outside the law. She gradually moves into the French village and lives out her activist life on the sidelines until England remembers her ...

Cast 
 Imogen Stubbs: Nanou
 Jean-Philippe Écoffey: Luc
 Michel Robin: Mr. Henry
 Daniel Day-Lewis: Max
 Roger Ibáñez: Michel
 Lou Castel: Italian activist
 Christophe Lindon: Charles
 Valentine Pelka: Jacques
 Nathalie Bécue: Chantal
 Dominique Rousseau: Rita
 Anna Cropper: Nanou's mother
 Patrick O'Connell: Nanou's father
 Anne-Marie Jabraud: Ms. Giraud
 Bérangère Jean
 Jean-Marc Morel: Jean
 Jean Amos: Robert
 Tristan Bastite: Léon

Datasheet 
 Sets: Andrew Mollo
 Costumes: Agnès Nègre
 Country of Origin: France
 Format: Colour – Mono – 35 mm
 Genre: Comedy

Reviews 
"An almost forgotten treasure from a filmmaker who disappeared from public life, almost without a trace, so is Malick. It is also the best performance of Imogen Stubbs." - Rüdiger Tomczak

References

External links 
 Nanou from Unifrance.org
 
 extract from YouTube

1986 films
British romantic drama films
French romantic drama films
1986 romantic drama films
1980s British films
1980s French films